Dennard Wilson (born March 31, 1982) is an American football coach and former safety who is the defensive backs coach for the Baltimore Ravens of the National Football League (NFL). He is a former American football safety in the NFL who was signed as a free agent by the Washington Redskins in 2004. He played college football at the University of Maryland and matriculated with a bachelor's degree in Communications.

Professional career 
Wilson enters his 16th NFL season. Wilson started his NFL coaching career with the Los Angeles/St. Louis Rams for five seasons. Following his stint with the Rams, Wilson coached four seasons with the New York Jets as the defensive backs coach. He added passing game coordinator duties as well in 2019. Under Wilson's tutelage, Jamal Adams earned All-Pro and Pro Bowl honors following the 2018 and '19 seasons after ranking first in sacks and tackles for loss among all NFL defensive backs during that span. Wilson moved onto to be the Defensive Backs coach for the Philadelphia Eagles in 2021. Named as the Passing game coordinator during the 2022-2023 season,  Wilson's defensive backs helped the Eagles to be  the #1 passing defense while finishing #2 total defense in the NFL. During this season, cornerbacks James Bradberry was named NFL 1st team All-Pro and Darius Slay was named to his 5th Pro Bowl. In addition, safety C. J. Gardner-Johnson was converted from slot corner and led the NFL in interceptions while only playing in 12 games. Following the 2022-23 season, Dennard departed the Eagles. Shortly after he was named Defensive Backs coach with the Baltimore Ravens.

Player Personnel / Scouting
He spent three years as a pro scout in the player personnel department for the Chicago Bears.

Playing career
Wilson played cornerback and safety for the Maryland Terrapins from 2000 until 2003, appearing in 42 games and making 30 starts. He totaled 158 tackles and was an honorable All-ACC pick as a senior after leading the Terrapins with 12 pass defenses. Wilson was a four-year letter winner  and three-year starting defensive back for the Terps. As a captain of the team, Wilson was an honorable mention All-ACC performer as a senior in 2003. An undrafted free agent, Wilson signed with the Washington Redskins in 2004 and spent time on their practice squad before suffering a season-ending injury.

References

External links
 Philadelphia Eagles profile

1982 births
Living people
American football safeties
Chicago Bears scouts
Los Angeles Rams coaches
Maryland Terrapins football players
New York Jets coaches
People from Upper Marlboro, Maryland
Philadelphia Eagles coaches
Players of American football from Maryland
St. Louis Rams coaches
Washington Redskins players
African-American players of American football
African-American coaches of American football
21st-century African-American sportspeople
20th-century African-American people